Musina is a village in the Veliko Tarnovo Province of northern Bulgaria.

Geography
Musina is located in the central Danubian Plain, near the Balkan Mountains (Stara Planina).
In the area of the village are two rivers: Negovanka and Peshterska.

History
Romans used a cave near Musina to supply fresh water to Nicopolis ad Istrum. Around the 12th century the village were town with Bulgarians.

According to the legend in the area Voditsa were lived the mother of Ivan Shishman of Bulgaria. Bee-eater from the village of Musina, painted the medieval fortress Tsarevets in a church mine. The mine was discovered by Dr. Maslev in Brasov and the fortress was restored by the paint.
The monastery school in Musina was created in 1790,which is the one of the first school in the villages in Veliko Tarnovo Province. 
From Musina are dozens of revolutionaries who participated in the army of Bacho Kiro and Pop Hariton. In Musina were made swords for the army.

Gallery

References 
Regional State Archive Veliko Tarnovo

Villages in Veliko Tarnovo Province